CHWE-FM (106.1 FM, Energy 106) is a radio station in Winnipeg, Manitoba. Owned by Evanov Communications, it broadcasts a CHR/Top 40 format.

CHWE-FM's studios and offices are located behind Polo Park at 202-1440 Jack Blick Avenue in Winnipeg, with sister stations CKJS-FM and CFJL-FM. The transmitter is located at Duff Roblin Provincial Park.

History
On May 8, 2009, Evanov Radio Group was granted approval by the CRTC to launch a new Winnipeg radio station on the 106.1 FM frequency. At first it was rumored that the company was going to launch another "Jewel" radio station, similar to CKDX-FM and various other stations around Ontario, as the Winnipeg station was registered as CFJL-FM.

On June 8, 2011, the station began testing its signal. On July 29, 2011, CJFL launched as rhythmic contemporary Energy 106. On October 14, the station added live shows from local nightclubs on Friday and Saturday nights, and launched its full-time airstaff on October 19.

On November 26, 2011, CFJL changed its call sign to CHWE-FM, to match the "Energy" moniker. The CFJL call sign would move to its sister station.

The new station's dance-leaning playlist paid off in the Numeris ratings, where in its first book it took a 6.9% share of the audience. The station has since moved to a more mainstream Top 40 direction.

In August 2020, Dave Wheeler, formerly of CITI-FM, was announced as the station's new morning host beginning August 31. The hiring proved controversial, as he had originally been fired from CITI in 2018 after making transphobic comments on his morning show. The station's program director defended the hiring, stating that Wheeler had "changed to fit us". Wheeler stated that "I have done a lot of work on me. It's profoundly personal when you take a deep look inside. I have put it all in the rear-view."

References

External links

 

Hwe
Hwe
Hwe
Radio stations established in 2011
2011 establishments in Manitoba